Doyle Elam Carlton, Sr. (July 6, 1885 – October 25, 1972) was an American lawyer and politician who served as the 25th Governor of the state of Florida.

Early life
Doyle Elam Carlton, the son of Albert and Martha Winfield McEwen Carlton, was born in Wauchula, Florida on July 6, 1885. He was born eighth out of ten children. He received his primary education in Wauchula and, as there was then no local high school, attended Stetson Academy where he served as an editor for the school newspaper and officer of the Phi Kappa Delta Society (later to become Delta Sigma Phi). He subsequently graduated from the Liberal Arts College of Stetson University with an A.B. in 1909. Doyle then attended The University of Chicago where he received an A.B. in 1910. He earned his L.L.B. in 1912 from Columbia University. In 1912, he was admitted to the practice of law in Florida and practiced law in Tampa beginning in that year.  On July 30, 1912, in Tampa, Doyle married Nell Ray, daughter of Edward Dennis and Mary Ellen Smith Ray.

Early political career
His political career began in 1916 when he  was elected to the Florida state senate for a two-year term as the State Senator from the 11th District, composed of Hillsborough and Pinellas counties.

After serving in the State Senate, Carlton would serve as Tampa's city attorney from 1925 to 1927. William J. Howey would claim during his gubernatorial campaign run in 1928 that Carlton would get large fees from selling municipal bonds when he was attorney and dodged serving in World War I.

1928 Gubernatorial election
In the Democratic primary on June 5, 1928 he received 77,569 first choice and 28,471 second choice votes to win in a field of five candidates, who included former Governor Sidney J. Catts. In November 1928, Doyle defeated his Republican opponent, William John Howey, by a margin of 148,455 votes to 95,018 votes. He assumed the office of governor on January 8, 1929. During Carlton's campaign he ran on the platform of "good government, good schools, and good roads".

Governorship 
During his term, he faced several financial problems caused by the Great Depression which begun under his term. He had to reduce payrolls and cut many state jobs in an attempt to reduce the state's budget. Carlton would also support more banking regulations. He would even personally reduce his own salary as governor from $9,000 to $7,500.

During his tenure as governor the state would face several other issues such as: the collapse of the state's land boom, a violent hurricane hit the state and a Mediterranean Tephritidae infestation. He left office on January 3, 1933, returning to Tampa, Florida.

Although Carlton was against inheritance and income taxes along with legalizing parimutuel betting, a three cent gas tax would be created during his term in order to help with the construction of highways. A tax commission and purchasing agency would be established in order to combat overspending in the state government. In 1931, a bill legalizing pari-mutuel betting would be passed despite Carlton's veto. Despite this, the legislature would nullify it by a margin of one state senator's vote as many members of the state legislature were desperate for more income for the state.

Post-gubernatorial political career and life 
In 1936, Governor Carlton ran for the Democratic nomination for U.S. Senator. Although he was endorsed by the Democratic executive committee and most state newspapers, Charles O. Andrews lined up a powerful bloc of forces opposed to Carlton, and by a margin of 67,387 votes to 62,530 votes defeated Governor Carlton in the primary of August 11, 1936.

President Eisenhower would appoint Carlton as a member of the Commission on Civil Rights in December 1957 staying there until 1961. After leaving the Commission on Civil Rights, he would serve as a member of the National Agricultural Advisory Commission starting in 1961 and leaving the advisory commission in 1963.

Personal life
On July 30, 1912, Carlton married Nell Ray in Tampa. He died in Tampa in 1972 and was buried at Myrtle Hill Memorial Park in Tampa. They had three children, Martha Katharine Carlton Ward, Mary Ellen Carlton Ott, and Doyle Elam Carlton, Jr., all of whom are deceased. The latter served as a state senator and ran for Governor of Florida in 1960, but was defeated in the Democratic primary run-off election by C. Farris Bryant.

References

External links
Official Governor's portrait and biography from the State of Florida
http://freepages.genealogy.rootsweb.com/~crackerbarrel/Carl6.html Rootwebs
 

Democratic Party governors of Florida
1885 births
1972 deaths
People from Tampa, Florida
People from Wauchula, Florida
Columbia Law School alumni
Stetson University alumni
20th-century American politicians